Iana Bondar (born 19 February 1991) is a Ukrainian former biathlete.

Performances

References

External links
 Biathlon.com.ua
 IBU.com
 IBU Datacenter

1991 births
Living people
B
Universiade medalists in biathlon
Universiade silver medalists for Ukraine
Universiade bronze medalists for Ukraine
Competitors at the 2013 Winter Universiade
Competitors at the 2015 Winter Universiade
Competitors at the 2017 Winter Universiade
Sportspeople from Kyiv Oblast